Caio Monteiro Costa (born 10 February 1997), commonly known as Caio Monteiro, is a Brazilian footballer who plays as a forward for Nova Venécia.

References

1997 births
Living people
Brazilian footballers
Brazil youth international footballers
Association football forwards
Footballers from Rio de Janeiro (city)
CR Vasco da Gama players
Paraná Clube players
Boavista Sport Club players
Grêmio Novorizontino players
Joinville Esporte Clube players
Grêmio Esportivo Anápolis players
Campeonato Brasileiro Série A players
Campeonato Brasileiro Série B players
Campeonato Brasileiro Série D players